Afonso of Portugal (c. 1288 – Lisbon, c. 1300; ;  or Alphonse) was a Portuguese  noble, son of Afonso of Portugal, Lord of Portalegre and his wife Violante Manuel. He was granted the title of Lord of Leiria. Afonso of Portugal died in 1300  when he was about twelve years of age without having married and without leaving any offspring.

References

Notes

Bibliography 
 
 
 
 

1288 births
House of Burgundy-Portugal
Portuguese infantes
People from Lisbon
13th-century Portuguese people
Year of death unknown